Tom Liesegang (Thomas Kirby von Richter Liesegang, born May 24, 1955) is an American artist who has lived and worked in Boston, New York and Los Angeles, as well as Amsterdam, Netherlands. His art is held in many public and private collections throughout the world.

Career and Development 
Inspired by Michelangelo's Pietà at the 1964 New York World's Fair, Liesegang knew at nine years of age that he wanted to become an artist. Upon graduation from high school, Liesegang supported himself with his composition skills as a window decorator for a chain of woman's fashion stores throughout New England.

After a brief sojourn to Los Angeles in 1977–1978, Liesegang returned to Boston to begin his art career. With no formal training beyond private painting lessons at age 12, exhibition of his work began in 1980 and continued into the 1990s.  In 1992, Liesegang relocated to New York City, switched from acrylic to oil painting and explored the diptych narrative format. In the aftermath of 9/11, Liesegang moved to Amsterdam where he began his foray into printmaking. Tombstone rubbings, often taken from the floors of some of Europe's oldest cathedrals and transferred into the screen printing process, inspired the artist to also incorporate the visual structure of illuminated manuscripts into his print work.

While in Amsterdam, Liesegang and film-maker Catharina Ooijens created Orka Fine Arts in 2004. The two created a documentary film concerning the Nazi confiscation of the Dutch International Archive for Woman. The film, titled, Private Possession, is in the permanent archives at the Hague.

Liesegang's subsequent works involve commemorative printmaking for marine vessels. The first being a limited, ten-print, commission from the United States Navy for the USS Virginia submarine. The print includes an image of the USS Virginias sea-trials, incorporated with design drawings of the first ironclad fighting ship, the CSS Virginia, obtained from the archives at the Maritime Museum at Newport, Virginia. Prints were awarded to key contractors and sponsors, including Senator John Warner, Admiral Edmund Giambastiani and Lynda Bird Johnson Robb, the daughter of President Lyndon Johnson.

In addition to printmaking on paper, Liesegang developed a method to use aluminum as his canvas; this allowed the ship's commemorative art to be made from the shipbuilder's materials and then framed with the identical woodwork that was used on the ship's interior. Printmaking is a tradition in the Netherlands, with Rembrandt being a notable contributor to the medium.

Since 2013, Liesegang is back in the United States and now divides his time between his painting studio in central Massachusetts and his involvement with the Amsterdam Grafisch Altelier art studio in Amsterdam.

Themes and Series 

Liesegang's painting is considered diverse and thematic, characterized by textured surfaces and bold graphic imagery often structured as diptychs. Much of Liesegang's work of the 1980s and 90's referenced history in order to confront contemporary issues such as geopolitics, sexuality, death, and religion. Direct observation of nature characterizes his most recent work.

Death Series (1982-1983) 
Death Series explored the immediacy of materials constructed over self-built light boxes exposing illuminated x-rays. This work came about following the sudden death of the artist's father in 1982. Titles such as, "Dead Men Tell No Tales" and "Shallow Grave" reference violence in American society as a cultural marker.

Red Light Series (1984-1987) 
Red Light Series (1984–1987) Influenced by German Expressionism, this series depicts strippers and prostitutes in often bold, jarring compositional structure. Liesegang saw irony between mainstream advertising's usage of sexuality with the female form and illicit outdoor advertising for prostitution found in many European cities at that time.

Martyr Series (1990-1992 )  
Martyr Series isolates the human figure on a life-size scale, Liesegang referenced 2nd and 3rd century subject matter as a basis for depicting the human figure, often in contorted poses to express human suffering. Diptychs rendered in a monochromatic palette often incorporating a three dimensional object and related text, resulted in a visual narrative.

Conflict Series (1986-2001) 
Conflict Series was Liesegang’s response to the "Tanker War" in the Persian Gulf in 1984 and subsequent Middle East conflicts, Liesegang referenced the current political global situation as a challenge to redefine the tradition-bound genre of maritime art. The artist's objective was to rely less on hyper-realism, than by dramatic use of composition, color, and emotion often incorporating periscope views in order to draw the viewer into the impending drama.

Mystical Series (2007-2010) 
After a life-altering out-of-body experience in 2007, Liesegang relied on print making in an attempt to depict an ineffable experiential mystery in his Mystical Series.

Present Efforts (2011-Present) 
Since 2011, Liesegang's work is influenced by direct observation of nature.  Against a contemporary backdrop of mass consumerism and an over reliance on technology. Semi abstracted water reflections and layered glass-like surfaces characterize this recent work.

Select List of Collections Holding Tom Liesegang's Work 
Liesegang's work is held in the public collections of:

 The Rose Museum at Brandeis University
 The Boston Public Library Archive of Prints and Drawings
 National Archives (Den Haag, NE)
 The Museum of Fine Arts (Boston)
 Worcester Museum (Worcester, MA)
 Navy Art Collection (Wash. DC)
 DeCordova Museum and Sculpture Park (Lincoln, MA)
 Gemeentearchief, (Amsterdam, NL)
 Rutger's University Print Archive (NJ)
 Vatican Library Print Archive (Rome, IT)
 Prudential Insurance Company of America (NJ)
 Pricewaterhouse Coopers
 Navy League of USA (Hampton Roads, VA)
 General Dynamics Electric Boat (Groton, CT)
 Northrop Grumman (Newport News, VA)
 Damen Shipyards Group (Gorinchem, NL)
 Heesen Yachts (Oss, NL)
 Lockheed Martin (Bethesda, MD)
 General Dynamics Electric Boat (Groton, CT)
 Rutgers University Print Archive (NJ)
 Coopers and Lybrand International Accountants 
 Goodwin Proctor and Hoar, Attorneys At Law (Boston, MA)
 Calamarino and Sohns, Attorneys At Law (New York, NY)
 Wytock and Roland Industries (Providence, RI)
 Office of Senator John Warner (Washington, DC)
 Hajenius (Amsterdam, NL) 
 Gemeentearchief (Amsterdam, NL)
 M Contemporary (New Orleans, LA) 
 National Oceanic and Atmospheric Administration (Washington, DC)

Reviews

References

External links 
 
 Superyacht gifts by Orka Fine Arts
 Orka Fine Arts – The Art of Superyachts

1955 births
Living people
20th-century American printmakers
21st-century American printmakers
American contemporary artists
Artists from Massachusetts
Artists from Boston